The year 1966 in television involved some significant events. Below is a list of television-related events in that year.

Events
January 3 – Hullabaloo on NBC in the United States shows promotional videos of The Beatles songs "Day Tripper" and "We Can Work It Out".
January 8 – Shindig! airs for the last time on ABC in the United States, with musical guests the Kinks and the Who.
January 11 – Dorothy Malone resumes the role of Constance Carson on Peyton Place (she had been temporarily replaced by Lola Albright).
January 12 – The first episode of the live-action Batman television series ("Hi Diddle Riddle") is aired on ABC in the United States starring Adam West and Burt Ward
January 13 – Tabitha is born on the Bewitched episode titled "And Then There Were Three."
February 1 – KFBB-TV in Great Falls, Montana becomes the first station in that state to affiliate primarily with ABC.
February 5 – ABC Scope begins to devote itself exclusively to coverage of the Vietnam war.
February 13 – The Rolling Stones make another appearance on The Ed Sullivan Show in the United States.
February 15 – Citing circumstances beyond his control, Fred Friendly resigns from CBS News in the United States.
February 18 – An Evening with Carol Channing airs on CBS in the United States.
February 23 – Television comes to Greece with the launch of ERT.
February 27 – Perry Mason airs its only color episode, "The Case of the Twice-Told Twist."
February – THVN (Vietnamese National Television Network) first launched.
March 30 – The special Color Me Barbra, with Barbra Streisand, airs on CBS in the United States.
April 18 – The Academy Awards air in color for the first time, on ABC.
May 15 – The first Japanese popular Owarai variety show program, Shoten, debuts on Nippon Television Network, and will be watched by more than 25 million Japanese every week.
June 5 – The Beatles make a taped appearance on The Ed Sullivan Show in the United States, debuting their music videos for "Rain" and "Paperback Writer."
June – ABS-CBN introduces color television to the Philippines, using NTSC.
July 1 – As part of the kickoff of Canada's centennial celebrations, color television broadcasts using NTSC are launched on state owned CBC and SRC, as well as on CTV.
July 10 – Ultraman debuts on TBS in Japan. The character would spawn over 16 television adaptions over the next 40 years.
July 16 – The Miss Universe pageant goes color.
July 30 – An all-time record United Kingdom television audience of more than 32,000,000 watches the England national football team beat West Germany 4–2 to win the FIFA World Cup at Wembley.
August 6 – In a post-fight interview, Howard Cosell honors Muhammad Ali's wishes to no longer be referred to as Cassius Clay, contrasting with the approach of most other sports reporters of the time.
September – ABC, CBS, and NBC complete the color transition from the previous season for their prime-time programming by the start of the fall season, with all network programs being telecast in color. 
September 8 – The first episode of Star Trek ("The Man Trap") is aired.
September 9 – The first episode of The Green Hornet ("The Silent Gun") is aired on ABC in the United States starring Van Williams and Bruce Lee.
September 10 – A night of firsts for the Miss America Pageant—its first color TV broadcast and its first airing on NBC.
September 11 – The Rolling Stones make another appearance on The Ed Sullivan Show.
September 19 – Color television comes to Alaska as KENI-TV airs the premiere episode of That Girl ("Don't Just Do Something, Stand There", which had aired in the "lower 48" on September 8).
October 2 – The four-part serial Talking to a Stranger, acclaimed as one of the finest British television dramas of the 1960s, begins transmission in the Theatre 625 strand on BBC2.
October 6 – After quickly cancelling The Tammy Grimes Show, ABC fills the void by launching a prime-time edition of The Dating Game.  The show's success leads to The Newlywed Game's own prime-time edition in January 1967.
October 15 – A TV version of the musical Brigadoon is telecast on ABC in the United States as a special, using an updated script and story line and re-introducing some of the songs cut from the 1954 movie. The production stars Robert Goulet, Peter Falk and Sally Ann Howes, also featuring Edward Villella and Marlyn Mason. The special airs only one other time, in 1967, before disappearing completely.
October 17 – All of NBC's news programming begins airing in full-color.
October 27 – It's the Great Pumpkin, Charlie Brown airs for the first time on CBS.
October 29 – Actor William Hartnell makes his last regular appearance as the First Doctor in the concluding moments of Episode 4 of the Doctor Who serial The Tenth Planet. Patrick Troughton briefly appears as the Second Doctor at the conclusion of the serial.
November 5 – Actor Patrick Troughton appears in his first full Doctor Who serial The Power of the Daleks as the Second Doctor.
November 7 – Concentration switches to color, establishing NBC as the first full color network with 100% color broadcasts.
November 16 – Cathy Come Home, one of the best-known plays ever to be televised in the UK, is presented in BBC1's The Wednesday Play anthology strand.
November 19 – First live 2-way satellite telecasts between Hawaii (KHVH-TV, now KITV) and the Mainland (ABC), via the Lani Bird satellite.
December 18 – CBS in the United States airs the How the Grinch Stole Christmas! animated TV special for the first time.
December 21 – A Christmas Memory, a recounting of Truman Capote's childhood experiences as captured in his 1956 memoir, is adapted for television on ABC Stage 67. Frank Perry directs, Capote himself narrates, and Geraldine Page (in an Emmy-winning performance) stars.
December 24 – WPIX in New York City premieres the Yule Log Christmas special which runs every year until 1989 and returns in 2001.
Also in 1966
The 1951–53 CBS sitcom Amos & Andy is pulled from syndication broadcast due to complaints from civil rights organizations.
Macdonald Carey starts reciting the epigram "Like sands through the hourglass, so are the days of our lives" at the beginning of his soap opera, Days of Our Lives, a tradition that continues over a decade after his death.

Programs/programmes
American Bandstand (1952–1989)
Another World (1964–1999)
Armchair Theatre (UK) (1956–1968)
As the World Turns (1956–2010)
Bewitched (1964–1972)
Blue Peter (UK) (1958–present)
Bonanza (1959–1973)
Bozo the Clown (1949–present)
Candid Camera (1948–present)
Captain Kangaroo (1955–1984)
Combat! (1962–1967)
Come Dancing (UK) (1949–1995)
Daniel Boone (1964–1970)
Days of Our Lives (1965–present)
Dixon of Dock Green (UK) (1955–1976)
Doctor Who (1963–present)
F Troop (1965–1967)
Face the Nation (1954–present)
Flipper (1964–1967)
Four Corners (Australia) (1961–present)
General Hospital (1963–present)
Get Smart (1965–1970)
Gilligan's Island (1964–1967)
Gomer Pyle, U.S.M.C. (1964–1969)
Grandstand (UK) (1958–2007)
Green Acres (1965–1971)
Gunsmoke (1955–1975)
Hallmark Hall of Fame (1951–present)
Hogan's Heroes (1965–1971)
I Dream of Jeannie (1965–1970)
I Spy (1965–1968)
Jeopardy! (1964–1975, 1984–present)
Juke Box Jury (1959–1967, 1979, 1989–1990)
Lost in Space (1965–1968)
Love of Life (1951–1980)
Match Game (1962–1969, 1973–1984, 1990–1991, 1998–1999)
Meet the Press (1947–present)
Mission: Impossible (1966–1973)
My Three Sons (1960–1972)
Opportunity Knocks (UK) (1956–1978)
Panorama (UK) (1953–present)
Perry Mason (1957–1966)
Petticoat Junction (1963–1970)
Peyton Place (1964–1969)
Run for Your Life (1965–1968)
Search for Tomorrow (1951–1986)
The Andy Griffith Show (1960–1968)
The Bell Telephone Hour (1959–1968)
The Beverly Hillbillies (1962–1971)
The Dean Martin Show (1965–1974)
The Doctors (1963–1982)
The Ed Sullivan Show (1948–1971)
The Edge of Night (1956–1984)
The Fugitive (1963–1967)
The Good Old Days (UK) (1953–1983)
The Guiding Light (1952–2009)
The Hollywood Palace (1964–1970)
The Late Late Show (Ireland) (1962–present)
The Lawrence Welk Show (1955–1982)
The Lucy Show (1962–1968)
The Marvel Super Heroes (1966)The Mike Douglas Show (1961–1981)The Milton Berle Show (1954–1967)The Secret Storm (1954–1974)The Sky at Night (UK) (1957–present)The Today Show (1952–present)The Tonight Show Starring Johnny Carson (1962–1992)This Is Your Life (UK) (1955–2003)Tom and Jerry (1965–1972, 1975–1977, 1980–1982)Top of the Pops (1964–2006)Truth or Consequences (1950–1988)Voyage to the Bottom of the Sea (1964–1968)Walt Disney's Wonderful World of Color(1961–1969)What the Papers Say (UK) (1956–2008)What's My Line (1950–1967)

Debuts
January – Father Brown on West Germany's ARD (1966–1972)
January 2 – Ultra Q on TBS in Japan (1966)
January 3 – Eye Guess on NBC-TV Daytime (1966–1969)
January 11 – Daktari on CBS (1966–1969)
January 12 – Batman on ABC (1966–1968)
April 5 – The Money Programme on BBC2 (1966–present)
June 6 – Till Death Us Do Part on BBC1
June 27 – Dark Shadows on ABC (1966–1971)
July 4 – Showdown & Chain Letter both on NBC daytime (canceled on October 14)
July 11 – The Newlywed Game on ABC (1966–1974)
July 17 – Ultraman on TBS in Japan (1966–1967)
July 18 – 
The Australian version of Play School on that country's ABC (1966–present)The 700 Club (1966–present)W-FIVE (1966–present)Wojeck (1966–1968)
September 1 –The Marvel Super Heroes (1966)
September 8 –Star Trek on NBC (1966–1969)That Girl on ABC (1966–1971)
Tarzan on NBC (1966–1968)
September 9 –The Green Hornet on ABC (1966–1967)The Time Tunnel on ABC (1966–1967)
September 10 –The New Adventures of Superman (1966–1970)
September 12 –The Monkees on NBC (1966–1968)Family Affair on CBS (1966–1971)The Iron HorseThe Rat Patrol premiere on ABC (both 1966–1968)
September 13 – The Girl from U.N.C.L.E. on NBC (1966–1967)
September 17 – Mission: Impossible on CBS (1966–1973)
September 20 – Rue des Pignons on SRC (1966–1977)
October 3 – Joe on BBC1
October 9 – Rocket Robin Hood (1966–1969)
October 11 – SRC launches its first made-in-Quebec sitcom, Moi et l'autre (1966–1971)
October 17 – The Hollywood Squares on NBC daytime (1966–1980)
October 19 – Cliff Dexter on West Germany's ZDF (1966–1968)
October 29 – The Mighty Heroes on CBS (1966–1967)
December 23 – Hoolihan & Big Chuck'' on WJW-TV, Cleveland, Ohio, United States (1966–1979)

Ending this year

Births

Deaths

See also
 1966–67 United States network television schedule

References